Anne Canteaut is a French researcher in cryptography, working at the French Institute for Research in Computer Science and Automation (INRIA) in Paris.  She studies the design and cryptanalysis of symmetric-key algorithms and S-boxes.

Education and career
Canteaut earned a diploma in engineering from ENSTA Paris in 1993.

She is currently the chair of the INRIA Evaluation Committee, and of the FSE steering committee. She was the scientific leader of the INRIA team SECRET between 2007 and 2019.

Cryptographic primitives
Canteaut has contributed to the design of several new cryptographic primitives:
 DECIM, a stream cipher submitted to the eSTREAM project
 SOSEMANUK, a stream cipher selected in the eSTREAM portfolio
 Shabal, a hash function submitted to the SHA-3 competition
 Prince, a lightweight block cipher

Recognition
Canteaut was awarded the Legion of Honour in 2019.

References

External links
 Home page
 

Year of birth missing (living people)
Living people
Modern cryptographers
French cryptographers
French computer scientists
Chevaliers of the Légion d'honneur